Events in the year 2014 in Brazil.

Incumbents

Federal government 
 President: Dilma Rousseff
 Vice President: Michel Temer

Governors
 Acre: Tião Viana
 Alagoas: Teotônio Vilela Filho
 Amapá: Camilo Capiberibe
 Amazonas: Omar Aziz (until 4 April), José Melo (starting 4 April)
 Bahia: Jaques Wagner
 Ceará: Cid Gomes
 Espírito Santo: Renato Casagrande
 Goiás: Marconi Perillo
 Maranhão: Roseana Sarney (until 10 December), Arnaldo Melo (starting 10 December)
 Mato Grosso: Silval da Cunha
 Mato Grosso do Sul: André Puccinelli
 Minas Gerais: Antônio Anastasia (until 4 April), Alberto Pinto Coelho (starting 4 April)
 Pará: Ricardo Coutinho
 Paraíba: Simão Jatene
 Paraná: Beto Richa
 Pernambuco: Eduardo Campos (until 3 April), João Lyra Neto (starting 3 April) 
 Piauí: Wilson Martins (until 4 April), Ze Filho (starting 4 April)
 Rio de Janeiro: 
 Rio Grande do Norte: Rosalba Ciarlini Rosado
 Rio Grande do Sul: Tarso Genro
 Rondônia: Confúcio Moura
 Roraima: 
 until 4 April: José de Anchieta Júnior
 4 April-1 December: Chico Rodrigues
 Santa Catarina: Raimundo Colombo
 São Paulo: Geraldo Alckmin
 Sergipe: Jackson Barreto
 Tocantins: José Wilson Siqueira Campos (until 9 May), Sandoval Cardoso (starting 9 May)

Vice governors
 Acre: 	Carlos César Correia de Messias 
 Alagoas: José Thomaz da Silva Nonô Neto 
 Amapá: Doralice Nascimento de Souza 
 Amazonas: José Melo de Oliveira 
 Bahia: Otto Alencar 
 Ceará: Domingos Gomes de Aguiar Filho 
 Espírito Santo: Givaldo Vieira da Silva 
 Goiás: José Eliton de Figueiredo Júnior 
 Maranhão: Joaquim Washington Luiz de Oliveira 
 Mato Grosso: Francisco Tarquínio Daltro 
 Mato Grosso do Sul: Simone Tebet 
 Minas Gerais: Alberto Pinto Coelho Júnior 
 Pará: Helenilson Cunha Pontes 
 Paraíba: Rômulo José de Gouveia 
 Paraná: Flávio José Arns 
 Pernambuco: João Soares Lyra Neto 
 Piaui: Antônio José de Moraes Souza Filho 
 Rio de Janeiro: Luiz Fernando Pezão (until 3 April), vacant thereafter (starting 3 April)
 Rio Grande do Norte: Robinson Faria 
 Rio Grande do Sul: Jorge Alberto Duarte Grill 
 Rondônia:  Airton Pedro Gurgacz 
 Roraima: Francisco de Assis Rodrigues 
 Santa Catarina: Eduardo Pinho Moreira
 São Paulo: Guilherme Afif Domingos 
 Sergipe: Jackson Barreto de Lima 
 Tocantins: João Oliveira de Sousa (until 3 April), vacant thereafter

Events 
 2014 protests in Brazil
 August 13 -  Governor Eduardo Campos, a candidate in the upcoming Brazilian presidential election, dies in a plane crash in Santos, São Paulo, together with six other people on board the aircraft. It also sparks a large fire.
 July - 6th BRICS summit
 July 3 - Belo Horizonte overpass collapse
 August 13 - 2014 Cessna Citation 560 XLS+ crash
 September 14 - Eike Batista charged with insider trading and manipulating the stock price of OGX.
 September 27 - Miss Brasil 2014
 October 5 & 26 - Brazilian general election, 2014
 October 18 - insider trading trial of Eike Batista begins.
 Brazilian NGO Imazon said that deforestation in the Amazon had surged 190% over the same month in 2013, a year which itself showed a 29% increase in deforestation.
 December 10 – 26 year old Sailson José das Graças is arrested for the serial murder as many as 41 people in a string of suspected racist hate crimes.

Arts and culture 
For Brazilian films first released in 2014, see the list of Brazilian films of 2014. In music, see the list of number-one pop hits of 2014 (Brazil) and the list of Hot 100 number-one singles of 2014 (Brazil).

Alberto da Costa e Silva won the Camões Prize.

Sports 
Brazil hosted the 2014 FIFA World Cup, 2014 Men's South American Volleyball Club Championship, the 2014 Women's South American Volleyball Club Championship and the 2014 FIVB Volleyball Men's Club World Championship.

In international multi-sport events, Brazil participated in the Winter Olympics, in the Winter Paralympics and also in the 2014 Summer Youth Olympics.

For events in football (soccer), see 2014 in Brazilian football.

For motorsport, see 2014 Campeonato Brasileiro de Turismo season, 2014 Desafio Internacional das Estrelas, 2014 Fórmula 3 Brasil season, 2014 Formula 3 Brazil Open, 2014 Fórmula Truck season, 2014 Brasileiro de Marcas season and 2014 Stock Car Brasil season.

Other sport events include the 2014 Brasil Open and the UFC Fight Night: Machida vs. Mousasi.

Deaths
January 5 – Nelson Ned, 66, Brazilian singer, pneumonia.
January 10 – Marly Marley, 75, Brazilian vedette and actress, pancreatic cancer.
February 2 – Eduardo Coutinho, 80, Brazilian film director, stabbed.
February 8 – Maicon Pereira de Oliveira, 25, Brazilian footballer, traffic collision.
February 22 – Arduíno Colassanti, 78, Italian-born Brazilian actor.
March 6 – Sérgio Guerra, 66, Brazilian economist and politician, member of the Federal Senate (2003–2011).
March 13 – Paulo Goulart, 81, Brazilian actor, cancer.
March 20 – Hilderaldo Bellini, 83, Brazilian footballer, two-time World Cup winner (1958, 1962), complications from a heart attack.
March 24 – Paulo Schroeber, 40, Brazilian guitarist (Almah), heart failure.
April 3 – Pedro Fré, 89, Brazilian Roman Catholic prelate, Bishop of Corumbá (1985–1989) and Barretos (1989–2000).
April 5 – José Wilker, 66, Brazilian actor (Medicine Man) and director, heart attack.
April 12 – Maurício Alves Peruchi, 24, Brazilian footballer, traffic collision.
April 17 – Henry Maksoud, 85, Brazilian businessman, cardiac arrest.
April 19 – Luciano do Valle, 66, Brazilian sports commentator.
April 25 – Paulo Malhães, 76-77, Brazilian soldier.
April 26 – José Moreira Bastos Neto, 61, Brazilian Roman Catholic prelate, Bishop of Três Lagoas (since 2009), heart attack.
April 26 – Aloísio Roque Oppermann, 77, Brazilian Roman Catholic prelate, Archbishop of Uberaba (1996–2012). (body discovered on this date)
May 2 – Tomás Balduino, 91, Brazilian Roman Catholic prelate, Bishop of Goiás (1967–1998).
May 8 – Homero Leite Meira, 82, Brazilian Roman Catholic prelate, Bishop of Itabuna (1978–1980) and Irecê (1980–1983).
May 8 – Jair Rodrigues, 75, Brazilian musician and singer, heart attack.
May 10 – Yeso Amalfi, 88, Brazilian footballer (Olympique de Marseille).
May 11 – Celso Pereira de Almeida, 86, Brazilian Roman Catholic prelate, Bishop of Porto Nacional (1976–1995) and Itumbiara (1995–1998).
May 13 – Altamiro Rossato, 88, Brazilian Roman Catholic prelate, Bishop of Marabá (1985–1989), Archbishop of Porto Alegre (1991–2001).
May 21 – João Filgueiras Lima, 82, Brazilian architect, prostate cancer.
May 23 – Joel Camargo, 67, Brazilian footballer (Santos), renal failure.
May 25 – Washington César Santos, 54, Brazilian footballer (national team), amyotrophic lateral sclerosis.
May 28 – Ciro de Quadros, 74, Brazilian physician, cancer.
May 31 – Marinho Chagas, 62, Brazilian footballer (Botafogo, national team), gastrointestinal bleeding.
June 7 – Fernandão, 36, Brazilian footballer (Sport Club Internacional, national team), helicopter crash.
June 7 – Helcio Milito, 83, Brazilian musician.
June 10 – Marcello Alencar, 88, Brazilian politician and lawyer, Governor of Rio de Janeiro (1995–1999), Mayor of Rio de Janeiro (1983–1986, 1989–1993).
June 10 – Vital João Geraldo Wilderink, 82, Dutch-born Brazilian Roman Catholic prelate, Bishop of Itaguaí (1980–1998).
June 14 – Alex Chandre de Oliveira, 36, Brazilian footballer (Hangzhou Greentown), heart attack.
June 15 – Moise Safra, 79, Syrian-born Brazilian billionaire financier, founder and chairman of Banco Safra, Parkinson's disease.
June 18 – Márcio Moreira, 67, Brazilian advertising executive.
June 20 – Oberdan Cattani, 95, Brazilian footballer (Sociedade Esportiva Palmeiras).
June 21 – Rose Marie Muraro, 83, Brazilian sociologist.
June 21 – Irajá Damiani Pinto, 94, Brazilian paleontologist.
June 26 – Moacyr José Vitti, 73, Brazilian Roman Catholic prelate, Archbishop of Curitiba (since 2004), heart attack.
June 27 – Amaro Macedo, 100, Brazilian botanist and plant collector.
July 6 – Benedito de Assis da Silva, 61, Brazilian footballer (Fluminense), multiple organ failure.
July 7 – Estanislau Amadeu Kreutz, 86, Brazilian Roman Catholic prelate, Bishop of Santo Ângelo (1973–2004), multiple organ failure.
July 8 – Plínio de Arruda Sampaio, 83, Brazilian jurist and politician, bone cancer.
July 9 – Luiz Alberto Dias Menezes, 63, Brazilian geologist and mineral dealer.
July 14 – Vange Leonel, 51, Brazilian singer, writer, feminist and LGBT activist, ovarian cancer.
July 18 – João Ubaldo Ribeiro, 73, Brazilian writer, pulmonary embolism.
July 19 – Rubem Alves, 80, Brazilian writer, philosopher and theologian, multiple organ failure due to pneumonia.
July 19 – Norberto Odebrecht, 93, Brazilian engineer, founder of Odebrecht and the Odebrecht Foundation, cardiac complications.
July 23 – Ariano Suassuna, 87, Brazilian writer, cardiac arrest as a complication from a stroke.
July 25 – Ronaldo Rogério de Freitas Mourão, 79, Brazilian astronomer.
July 26 – Spiridon Mattar, 93, Lebanese-born Brazilian Melkite Catholic hierarch, Bishop of Nossa Senhora do Paraíso em São Paulo (1978–1990).
July 30 – Fausto Fanti, 35, Brazilian humorist (Hermes & Renato) and guitarist (Massacration), suicide by hanging.
August 3 – Benedito de Ulhôa Vieira, 93, Brazilian Roman Catholic prelate, Archbishop of Uberaba (1978–1996).
August 11 – Djalma Cavalcante, 57, Brazilian football player and coach, heart attack.
August 11 – Armando Círio, 98, Italian-born Brazilian Roman Catholic prelate, Archbishop of Cascavel (1978–1995).
August 13 – Eduardo Campos, 49, Brazilian politician, Minister of Science and Technology (2004–2005), Governor of Pernambuco (2007–2014), 2014 presidential candidate, plane crash.
August 24 – Antônio Ermírio de Moraes, 86, Brazilian businessman, CEO of the Votorantim Group, heart failure.
September 1 – Sérgio Rodrigues, 86, Brazilian architect and designer.
September 11 – Jerônimo Garcia de Santana, 79, Brazilian politician, Governor of Rondônia (1987–1991), Mayor of Porto Velho (1986).
September 13 – Iberê Ferreira, 70, Brazilian politician, Governor of Rio Grande do Norte (2010–2011).
September 14 – Servílio Conti, 97, Italian-born Brazilian Roman Catholic prelate, Bishop of Roraima (1965–1975).
September 30 – Jadir Ambrósio, 91, Brazilian musician and composer.
October 3 – Lori Sandri, 65, Brazilian football manager, brain tumor.
October 4 – Hugo Carvana, 77, Brazilian actor (Entranced Earth, Antonio das Mortes) and director (Casa da Mãe Joana).
October 15 – João Corso, 86, Brazilian Roman Catholic prelate, Bishop of Campos (1990–1995).
November 1 – Edson Décimo Alves Araújo, 27, Brazilian footballer (Atlético-PR), shot.
November 1 – Alberto Johannes Först, 87, German-born Brazilian Roman Catholic prelate, Bishop of Dourados (1990–2001).
November 11 – Caetano Lima dos Santos, 98, Brazilian bishop of the Roman Catholic Church.
November 13 – Manoel de Barros, 97, Brazilian poet.
November 14 – Adib Jatene, 85, Brazilian cardiologist and politician, Minister of Health (1992, 1995–1996), heart attack.
November 20 – Márcio Thomaz Bastos, 79, Brazilian politician, Minister of Justice (2003–2007), lung failure.
November 20 – Samuel Klein, 91, Polish-born Brazilian magnate (Casas Bahia).
December 3 – Alfredo Ernest Novak, 84, American-born Brazilian Roman Catholic prelate, Bishop of Paranaguá (1989–2006).
December 9 – José Feghali, 53, Brazilian pianist, suicide by gunshot.
December 23 – João Nílson Zunino, 68, Brazilian executive, President of Avaí FC (2002–2013).

See also 
2014 in Brazilian football

References

 
2010s in Brazil
Years of the 21st century in Brazil
Brazil
Brazil